The 2007 Labour Party leadership election was triggered on 10 May 2007 by incumbent leader Tony Blair's announcement that he would resign as leader on 27 June. At the same time that Blair resigned, John Prescott resigned as Deputy Leader, triggering a concurrent election for the deputy leadership.

Informal campaigning had been ongoing ever since Blair announced in 2004 that he would not be fighting a fourth general election as leader. Pressure for a timetable eventually led him to announce on 7 September 2006 that he would step down within a year. Labour's National Executive Committee (NEC) met on 13 May 2007 to decide a timetable. Nominations opened on 14 May and closed at 12:30 UTC+1 on 17 May 2007.

Blair said he expected Gordon Brown to succeed him, and that Brown "would make an excellent Prime Minister". When nominations for the leadership elections opened, Blair was one of those nominating Brown. From the start, most observers considered Brown the overwhelming favourite to succeed Blair; John McDonnell, his only challenger, failed to secure enough nominations in order to get onto the ballot, and conceded defeat. Brown received 313 (88.2%) nominations to McDonnell's 29 (8.2%), making it mathematically impossible for anyone other than Brown to be nominated.

The election process concluded with Brown being declared leader at a special conference on 24 June 2007. On 27 June, Blair resigned as Prime Minister of the United Kingdom and was succeeded by Brown.

If Brown had been opposed, Labour Party members would for the first time have directly elected a new Prime Minister.

Background

Initial signals that Tony Blair's leadership was to end 
On 30 September 2004, Tony Blair said he would not seek a fourth term as Prime Minister. Labour went on to win a third successive term at the May 2005 general election with a decreased majority of 66, with Blair pledging to serve another full term.

Labour and Blair subsequently had a surge in popularity at the time of terrorist bombings of London of July 2005, but by the Spring of 2006 were facing significant difficulties, most notably with scandals over failures by the Home Office to deport illegal immigrants and national campaigns by many political parties and think tanks saying that the United Kingdom was being overrun by immigrants. Worries over the potential increase of support for the British National Party during the 2006 Local Election campaign saw many Labour backbenchers and activists begin to demand a timetable from Blair for his departure, with many suggesting that it should be sooner rather than later.

Speculation over the timing of Blair's resignation had been amplified by a variety of politicians and newspapers making their own predictions. On 21 April The Guardian reported that the Gordon Brown camp were working on the assumption that Blair would announce the candidacy open on 9 May 2007, the day after power-sharing was due to start in Northern Ireland, following which the new Labour leader would be elected on 15 July 2007.

Talk of David Miliband, Alan Milburn, Charles Clarke or John Reid as possible candidates was almost constant, although the former consistently denied any ambition to stand and the latter three refused to make a decision until there was a vacancy, ultimately declining in the week before Blair requested the NEC to find a successor.

Demands for Blair to announce a resignation timetable 
On 15 July 2006, John McDonnell became the first Labour MP to announce an intention to stand for the leadership when Blair resigned.

On 5 September 2006, 17 Labour MPs signed a letter asking Blair to resign, accompanied by press reports alleging that up to 80 MPs were willing to sign. Later, senior party members stated that Tony Blair would not be Prime Minister at the next Labour Party conference and on 6 September, Tom Watson, one of the MPs who signed the letter, resigned as Junior Defence Minister along with seven Parliamentary Private Secretaries: Khalid Mahmood, Wayne David, Ian Lucas, Mark Tami, Chris Mole, David Wright and Iain Wright.

On 7 September, Jack Straw stated that he expected the Prime Minister to announce a timetable for his departure in May 2007 and Blair announced that the September 2006 Labour Party Conference and TUC Conference would be the last he would attend as party leader, despite which he was heckled at the Trades Union Congress on 12 September by members calling for him to resign immediately.

On 23 September, John Hutton became the first serving Cabinet Minister to say that Gordon Brown should face a serious challenger for Labour's leadership.

At the 2006 Labour Party Conference on 25 September, Brown announced his candidacy for the leadership, while three days later at the same conference John Prescott announced that he would stand down when Blair resigned as Prime Minister.

During the debate on The Queen's Speech on 15 November, Blair said Conservative leader David Cameron was a "flyweight against a heavyweight" at the next general election, widely interpreted as implicit support for Brown.

Campaigning commences 
In January 2007, Brown outlined a number of his potential policies for Britain, mentioning citizen responsibility, education, efforts to solve problems in Africa and "a new style of politics" as his priorities. On 17 January, he spoke of "a new world order" while on a tour of India, and announced backing for India's bid for a place as a permanent member on the UN Security Council, and on many other international bodies. On 21 March, at 12:30 pm, he delivered the budget for the 2007–08 financial year, his last budget as Chancellor of the Exchequer.

On 16 January, Blair declared his intention to attend a summit of EU leaders as Prime Minister on 21–22 June 2007, and on 28 January stated that he was "not finished yet", and intended to complete the public sector reforms he had started, as well as leading Labour into local and devolved Elections on 3 May.

On 17 January, left-wing MP John McDonnell claimed that support for his leadership challenge had grown to within striking distance of the necessary backing. Michael Meacher, former Minister of State for the Environment in the DETR and its successor Defra announced that he was also seeking nominations from MPs and was considering standing. On 22 February he became the third Labour MP to announce his intention to stand for the leadership, although critics in the media expressed doubt over the extent of backbench support for either challenger at this point.

On 2 March, Jack Straw casually declined to run for the leadership after reports that someone had placed a £500 bet on his winning. On 20 March, the Labour Party NEC met to decide on rules for the upcoming leadership elections. On 13 April, Brown met US President George W. Bush for the first time, in a reportedly amicable discussion. On 15 April he encouraged rivals to "bring it on", in response to numerous reports suggesting that he would face three or four contenders for the leadership.

David Miliband declared on 17 April that he would not be a candidate for the Labour leadership or Deputy leadership, and had not wavered in his position on that issue in the past three years. He subsequently announced his support for Brown in any leadership election. On 20 April, The Independent reported that many of Blair's closest allies were eager to unite the Blair and Brown camps and prevent any challenge to Gordon Brown from dividing the party. The next day, The Guardian reported that 217 MPs had already signed up to back Gordon Brown's leadership. There were also reports that even among the undecided, many were keen to prevent the progress of Michael Meacher and John McDonnell.

On 27 April, Michael Meacher and John McDonnell agreed that whichever had fewer supporters the day after Blair resigned as Labour leader would step aside, to allow the other a stronger chance to secure the support of the 45 MPs necessary to qualify for the ballot paper. On 1 May, Blair announced that he would announce his resignation as Labour leader the following week, following which he expected a campaign of about seven weeks. He also announced his support for Brown to succeed him as Labour leader and Prime Minister. On 3 May, the day after Blair and Brown's tenth anniversary as Prime Minister and Chancellor of the Exchequer, elections were held for English and Scottish Local Government, the Scottish Parliament and the Welsh Assembly. Labour faced mixed results, making gains in some areas, with slightly higher support than the previous year in the Local Elections and fairly minimal losses in the devolved elections, remaining the largest party in Wales and having one less seat than the SNP in Scotland, while losing many English council seats, mainly to the Conservative Party.

On 3 May, Charles Clarke changed his position towards Brown, praising him publicly and denying that he was poised to challenge for the Labour leadership. In an interview with The Times the following day, he claimed that he could get a sufficient number of nominations to stand for the Labour leadership, but that the Labour Party did not "have the appetite" for such a contest. John Reid and John Hutton also announced their support for Brown, Reid going on to announce that he would be stepping down as Home Secretary upon the departure of Blair and Prescott.

On 9 May, in the last Prime Minister's Questions before Blair announced the vacancy for the Labour leadership, David Cameron described the Labour government as "like The Living Dead". Blair ignored Cameron's taunts regarding the possible chaos caused by interim arrangements for election of a new Labour leader and the upcoming resignation of John Reid from the government.

Blair asks Labour NEC to seek a new leader 
On 10 May Blair announced to the Sedgefield Labour Party that he would stand down as Prime Minister on 27 June 2007, and that he would be requesting Labour's NEC to seek a new party leader. Shortly afterwards, John Prescott announced that he would stand down as Deputy Prime Minister on the same day and that he had written to the NEC to announce his resignation as party Deputy Leader. Labour's NEC met on 13 May to finalise a timetable for the handover, confirming that Blair would remain leader until a new leader was elected, and giving any potential candidates three active Parliament days in which to submit their papers. Brown, Michael Meacher and John McDonnell held a joint policy debate in London.

On 10 May, John McDonnell and Michael Meacher delayed a decision over which one should run, describing their respective levels of support as "too close to call". Interviewed by Red Pepper, John McDonnell stated that he could and would not support Michael Meacher, since he had voted with New Labour on many issues, and that it was a matter of them sitting down together to compare how many votes they had and decide a way forward. On 14 May Michael Meacher declared that he would not be a candidate in the Labour leadership election, since he did not have enough MPs support to get onto the ballot paper, going on to say he would be backing John McDonnell to get a left-wing candidate onto the ballot paper, though the possibility of this was still in doubt.

On 10 May, Secretary of State for Northern Ireland Peter Hain and Solicitor General Harriet Harman both announced that they had more than the minimum necessary number of nominations to appear on the Ballot paper for the Deputy Leadership Election, claiming 47 and 44 nominations respectively.

Candidates
John McDonnell and Gordon Brown were the only candidates as the election process began with the nominations round. In order to secure a place on the ballot paper, candidates needed to submit their nominations to the National Executive Committee (NEC) by 17 May, each supported by at least 12.5% of Labour MPs (45 Labour MPs, including the candidate themselves). Brown, the only successfully nominated candidate, was declared leader at a special Labour conference on 24 June 2007.

 Gordon Brown, Chancellor of the Exchequer, long the favourite candidate to succeed Tony Blair, received 313 nominations and was successfully nominated.
 John McDonnell, chair of the Socialist Campaign Group, pledged to merge Old Labour and New Labour into what he calls Real Labour, and to "save the Labour government from itself". He was hoping to get the backing of all those who had been backing Michael Meacher, but did not do so; with 29 nominations, he was 16 short of the minimum required number, and was not successfully nominated.
 Michael Meacher (withdrew on 14 May 2007), former Minister of State for the Environment, was a candidate but withdrew after failing to get enough nominations. On 27 April 2007, he and McDonnell announced that whichever of them had the support of fewer Labour MPs at the point of Tony Blair's resignation would withdraw from the campaign and support the other. On 10 May, they delayed their announcement because "levels of support for each were too close to call". Meacher gave his support to McDonnell on 14 May, but not all his supporters switched allegiance.

Nominations and result

Only Gordon Brown attained over 45 nominations and was thus elected unopposed.

Suggested candidates who declined to run
During the months leading up to Tony Blair's resignation, media attention focused on a wide range of Labour politicians, most of whom publicly refused to stand:
Hilary Benn, the Secretary of State for International Development, was touted as a possible candidate to succeed Blair. However, he backed Gordon Brown.
Charles Clarke, former Home Secretary, had insisted he would stand if David Miliband did not, but later softened his position with praise for Brown, also saying that the Labour Party didn't have the appetite for a contest. He indicated that he would like to serve in a future Labour Cabinet; however, he was not offered any position, and went on to lose his seat in the subsequent general election in 2010.
John Hutton, Secretary of State for Work and Pensions, had said there should be a serious opponent to Brown, but on 6 May 2007 declared his support for Brown.
Glenda Jackson, MP for Hampstead and Highgate and former transport minister, had repeatedly threatened to stand as a stalking horse candidate against Blair from 2005 onwards; however, she backed Brown for the leadership.
Alan Johnson, Secretary of State for Education. In autumn 2006, he was (alongside John Reid) being touted as one of very few serious contenders, but later backed Brown.
Lynne Jones, MP for Birmingham Selly Oak, said that she would stand against Brown for the leadership as a leftwing candidate. However, she later backed John McDonnell.
Alan Milburn ruled out standing for the Labour leadership on 11 May 2007, but previously had refused to rule it out.
David Miliband, Secretary of State for Environment, Food and Rural Affairs. Speculation that he would be persuaded to stand was intense during spring 2007, including suggestions that Blair saw him as a possible successor. However, Miliband declined to stand, saying publicly that this had been his unwavering position for three years, and that he would vote for Brown.
John Reid, Home Secretary, had said he would not reveal whether he would stand or not until there was a vacancy, but on 6 May announced he would be voting for Brown and had decided to leave the Cabinet along with Blair.
Jack Straw, Leader of the House of Commons, announced on 25 March that he would be running Gordon Brown's leadership campaign. He was appointed Lord Chancellor and Secretary of State for Justice in Brown's first cabinet.

See also
2007 Labour Party deputy leadership election
2010 United Kingdom general election
Blair–Brown deal

References

External links
Labour Party website

2007 elections in the United Kingdom
2007
Uncontested elections
Labour Party leadership election (UK)